The Plum Creek Timber Land was established by the General Land Office in Colorado on June 23, 1892, with . On May 12, 1905, the forest was consolidated with Pike's Peak Forest Reserve and the name was discontinued.

References

External links
Forest History Society
Forest History Society:Listing of the National Forests of the United States Text from Davis, Richard C., ed. Encyclopedia of American Forest and Conservation History. New York: Macmillan Publishing Company for the Forest History Society, 1983. Vol. II, pp. 743-788.

Former National Forests of Colorado